Peggy Mayfield (born August 1, 1963) is an American politician who has served in the Indiana House of Representatives from the 60th district since 2012.

References

1963 births
Living people
Republican Party members of the Indiana House of Representatives
21st-century American politicians
21st-century American women politicians
Women state legislators in Indiana